Reef HQ (typeset as ReefHQ) is the world's largest living coral reef aquarium. It is located in Townsville, Queensland, Australia. The aquarium was built as a Bicentennial Commemorative project and is a part of the Great Barrier Reef Marine Park Authority (GBRMPA). The Coral Reef Exhibit has 130 coral species and 120 fish species along with hundreds of species of sea stars, sea urchins, sea cucumbers, brittle stars, feather stars, snails, worms and sponges.

History
Reef HQ was originally the vision of Dr Graeme Kelleher, a former chairman of the Great Barrier Reef Marine Park Authority (GBRMPA). Dr Kelleher's primary objective was to bring the marine environment onto the land and make it easily accessible to the public whilst also encouraging the public to help protect the reef.

ReefHQ was originally known as Great Barrier Reef Aquarium when it opened on 14 June 1987. The aquarium was renamed "ReefHQ" in 1999. Since 2009 the name of the aquarium was changed to reflect its original name. It is now known as Reef HQ Great Barrier Reef Aquarium. The facility itself is currently undergoing some renovations and refurbishments for further improvement, and is expected to reopen in late 2023.

Description

Reef HQ Aquarium is inclusive of the Coral Reef Exhibit, a Predator Exhibit, a children's section, a gift shop and cafe. In 2006 Reef HQ opened new 'Exploring our Wetlands' interactive kiosks developed by the Great Barrier Reef Marine Park Authority.

Location
Reef HQ Aquarium is located in the same complex as the Museum of Tropical Queensland and the Townsville Aboriginal and Torres Strait Islander Cultural Centre and an IMAX theatre in the Central Business District. Over 110,000 visitors tour Reef HQ Aquarium every year.

Coral Reef Exhibit
Water motion is created in the Coral Reef Exhibit by a pneumatic wave machine. Unusually, the aquarium is open to the weather, receiving precipitation, sun- and moonlight, just like natural coral reefs. The tank holds approximately 2.5 million litres of water.

Predator Exhibit 
The underwater tunnel is open one side to view the Coral Reef Exhibit, the other side is a mesmerizing display of larger predatory species such as potato cod, blacktip reef sharks and leopard shark (which have been bred successfully at Reef HQ). The backdrop of this exhibit resembles a wreck, which could be taken as a replica of the world famous the SS Yongala (lying submerged south off the coast from Townsville).

See also
Great Barrier Reef Marine Park
Reef HQ Aquarium website

References

External links

Aquaria in Australia
Tourist attractions in Queensland
Buildings and structures in Townsville
1987 establishments in Australia
Zoos in Queensland